I've Failed You is the sixth and most recent studio album by heavy metal band Kittie. The album was released on August 30, 2011 and peaked on the Billboard Top 200 at 178, selling over 3,000 copies in its debut week. The album received mixed reviews with About.com and Exclaim! calling it one of Kittie's strongest albums, while Allmusic and NOW! gave it negative reviews. It was the last album to feature bassist Ivana "Ivy" Vujic before she left in 2012, until her return in 2022.

Release
I've Failed You was released on August 30, 2011 and peaked on the Billboard Top 200 at 178. The album also charted on Billboards's Top Hard Rock Albums, Top Independent Albums, Top Rock Albums charts, peaking at 10, 26 and 46th positions respectively.

Reception

Exclaim! gave I've Failed You a positive review, referring to the album as Kittie's "most accomplished release to date" and that the tracks "We Are the Lamb," "What Have I Done" and "Empires (Part 2)" feature some of their best songwriting to date. About.com gave the album a positive review, opining that Kittie's "musical chops have grown stronger, their songwriting more consistent" while "The songs on the second half of the album aren't quite as memorable as the first half, but there are still plenty of quality tracks." Allmusic gave the album a two and a half star rating out of five, stating that the album "sounds nearly interchangeable with their previous releases, which may provide solace for some of the quartet's many fans, but will likely provide a whole lot of ammunition for their detractors." NOW gave the album a two star out of five rating, criticizing the album as being "devoid of memorable lyrics, riffs or melodies".

Track listing
All songs written by Kittie.

Personnel
Kittie
 Morgan Lander – lead vocals, guitars, piano 
 Mercedes Lander – drums, percussion, backing vocals 
 Tara McLeod – guitars 
 Ivy Vujic Jenkins – bass

Additional personnel
 Paul Grosso – creative director
 Ama Lea – photography
 Sean Marlowe – art direction, design
 Siegfried Meier – engineer, mixing, producer
 T-Roy – mastering

References

2011 albums
Kittie albums
E1 Music albums
Albums produced by Siegfried Meier